The federal Chief Information Officer of the United States, also known as the United States Chief Information Officer, is the administrator of the Office of Electronic Government, or the Office of the Federal CIO (OFCIO), which is part of the Office of Management and Budget.  The President appoints the Federal CIO. The appointee does not require Senate confirmation. It was created by the E-Government Act of 2002.

The US CIO oversees federal technology spending, federal IT policy, and strategic planning of all federal IT investments. The CIO is charged with establishing a government-wide enterprise architecture that ensures system interoperability, information sharing, and maintains effective information security and privacy controls across the federal government.

Clare Martorana is the incumbent CIO.

Officeholders 
 Vivek Kundra was the first person to use the title Federal Chief Information Officer. Previous holders of the office used the title Administrator for E-government and Information Technology at the Office of Management and Budget.

 On August 4, 2011, Steven VanRoekel was named to be the second Chief Information Officer of the United States.

 Lisa Schlosser was the acting CIO after VanRoekel resigned in November 2014.

 On Thursday, February 5, 2015, President Barack Obama appointed Tony Scott, who had been serving as leader of the global information technology group at VMware Inc., since 2013, to fill the office. He had served as Chief Information Officer at Microsoft from 2008 to 2013, and as CIO at the Walt Disney Company from 2005 to 2008. Scott served from February 2015 to January 2017.

 In 2017, the acting Chief Information Officer was Margie Graves. She previously served as the U. S. Department of Homeland Security's (DHS) Deputy Chief Information Officer.

 Suzette Kent, formerly a principal of Ernst and Young, was appointed Federal CIO in January 2018, and left office in July 2020.
Clare Martorana assumed office on March 9, 2021.

See also
 Chief Technology Officer of the United States

References 

Science and technology in the United States
2009 establishments in the United States
Agencies of the United States government

External links